The Vivarium was the location where the ancient Romans kept wild animals used in their entertainments. It was near the Prenestina Gate of Rome. During the first siege of Rome in the Gothic Wars, the Goths broke part of the wall of the Vivarium in an attempt to enter the city. This attempt failed because the regular city wall manned by Roman soldiers was behind the Vivarium wall and Belisarius attacked the rear of the Goths near the Prenestina Gate.

According to the writer Charlotte Anne Eaton, a second, smaller vivarium was located near the Colosseum and was connected to it via a low vaulted passage. This vivarium was located below the convent of St. John and St. Paul on the Cœlian Mount. This vivarium was a practical necessity because of the considerable distance between the Vivarium by Porta Maggiore and the Colosseum.

References

Ancient Roman buildings and structures in Rome
Benedictine monasteries in Italy